Ice Sports Palace Sibir is an indoor sporting arena located in Novosibirsk, Russia.  The capacity of the arena is 7,400. It is the home arena of the HC Sibir Novosibirsk ice hockey team.

References 

Indoor ice hockey venues in Russia
Indoor arenas in Russia
Kontinental Hockey League venues
HC Sibir Novosibirsk